A Sister is a 2018 Belgian live-action short film directed by Delphine Girard. It has been selected and awarded at several film festivals including Rhode Island International Film Festival in August 2019 where it won the Oscar Qualifying Best Short Film Award. The film was also nominated at the 9th Magritte Awards ceremony in February 2019 in Best Live Action Short Film category.

In January 2020, it was nominated for the 2020 Academy Award for Best Live Action Short Film.

Plot 
A night. A car. Alie is in danger. To get by, she must make the most important phone call of her life.

Awards 
Since its launch, the film has been selected in many festivals around the world and has received several awards.

References

External links 

 

2018 films
2010s French-language films
Belgian short films
2018 short films
French-language Belgian films